Craig Edward Ramsay (born March 17, 1951) is a Canadian professional ice hockey coach and former player. He played in the NHL from 1971 to 1985 for the Buffalo Sabres, notably featuring in the 1975 Stanley Cup Finals with the Sabres. After his playing career, he became a coach with the Sabres and later served as the final head coach of the Atlanta Thrashers. He is the head coach of the Slovakia men's national ice hockey team.

Playing career
Ramsay began his hockey career with the Peterborough Petes in 1968. Ramsay spent four seasons in Peterborough where he excelled at the game. He caught the attention of many scouts and in 1971 he was drafted 19th overall by the Buffalo Sabres in the 1971 NHL Amateur Draft.

In 1971–72, Ramsay played a couple of games in the American Hockey League before being called up by the Sabres. He was paired up with his close friend Don Luce and together, the two formed a formidable offensive-defensive line that shut out many of the NHL's top lines.

In 1974–75, the Sabres drafted young prospect Danny Gare and he was paired up with Ramsay and Luce. The Sabres that year made it all the way to the Stanley Cup Finals before being defeated by the Philadelphia Flyers. Ramsay had a total tally of 12 points during that run. With the addition of Danny Gare, Ramsay's line became not only a threat defensively but also offensively.

Ramsay had eight consecutive 20 goal seasons and was selected to play in the 1976 NHL All-Star Game. His linemate, Gare scored a total of 56 goals in 1979–80. Ramsay played for ten seasons for the Sabres which included playing 776 games consecutively.

In 1984–85, Ramsay was awarded the Frank J. Selke Trophy for his defensive capabilities as a forward. Ramsay retired shortly afterwards ending a 14-year career with the Sabres which included 1,070 career NHL games, 252 goals and 420 assists for 672 points. He was inducted into the Buffalo Sabres Hall of Fame in 1986 to honour his playing career with the club.

Ramsay was the last player to play a full season without incurring any penalties. He did this in 1973–74, playing 78 games and recording 46 points.

Coaching career
Following Ramsay's retirement, he was named the assistant coach for the Buffalo Sabres in 1986–87 and served as interim head coach late in the year posting a 4–15–2 record. He also served as the team director of player personnel and assistant general manager with the Sabres. In 1992–93, Ramsay left the Sabres organization and joined the Florida Panthers as assistant coach. He stayed there until 1995 before joining the Ottawa Senators also as an assistant coach.

In 1997–98, Ramsay joined the Philadelphia Flyers. He was named interim head coach in February 2000 for Roger Neilson who was being treated for cancer.  Ramsay guided the team to a 16–8–1–0 mark while claiming the Atlantic Division with 105 points. He led the team all the way to the Eastern Conference Finals before being eliminated by the eventual Stanley Cup champions, New Jersey Devils.  Neilson was dismissed by the Flyers for health reasons at the end of the 1999–2000 NHL season and Ramsay started the 2000–01 season as head coach before being fired after 28 games as the Flyers went 12–12–4–0 to start the season.

He joined the Tampa Bay Lightning in 2001 as an assistant coach. There, Ramsay won his first Stanley Cup ever in 2004 as the Lightning beat the Calgary Flames in seven games. In 2006–07, he joined the Boston Bruins as another assistant coach. The Bruins made the playoffs every year and finished first in the Eastern Conference in 2008–09. On June 24, 2010, he was named the head coach for the Atlanta Thrashers. He was dismissed by the team's new ownership group, True North Sports and Entertainment following the Thrasher's relocation to Winnipeg, Manitoba. Ramsay was appointed an assistant coach with the Florida Panthers under head coach Kevin Dineen following his dismissal from Atlanta. He was fired by the Panthers along with Dineen and assistant coach Gord Murphy on November 8, 2013. Ramsay was hired by the Edmonton Oilers as assistant coach on June 10, 2014 replacing Kelly Buchberger. He was let go by the Oilers on June 4, 2015, along with fellow assistant Keith Acton.

Ramsay joined the Slovakia men's national ice hockey team in 2017. His emphasis on offensive play bore fruit when the team won the bronze medal at the 2022 Winter Olympics in Beijing, defeating Sweden 4-0.

A biography of Ramsay was published in Slovakia in November 2022. Titled Šťastný chlapec (Happy Boy), it was written by Peter Jánošík and Tomáš Kyselica, two members of the Slovak Ice Hockey Federation's public relations team.

Awards and achievements
 Played in 1976 NHL All-Star Game
 Frank J. Selke Trophy winner in 1985
 Stanley Cup champion in 2004 (as assistant coach)
 Bronze medal at the 2022 Winter Olympics as head coach of the Slovak national team

Career statistics

NHL coaching record

See also
 List of NHL players with 1,000 games played
 List of NHL players who spent their entire career with one franchise

References

External links
 

1951 births
Living people
Atlanta Thrashers coaches
Boston Bruins coaches
Buffalo Sabres coaches
Buffalo Sabres draft picks
Buffalo Sabres executives
Buffalo Sabres players
Canadian ice hockey coaches
Canadian ice hockey left wingers
Cincinnati Swords players
Dallas Stars scouts
Edmonton Oilers coaches
Florida Panthers coaches
Florida Panthers scouts
Frank Selke Trophy winners
Ice hockey coaches at the 2018 Winter Olympics
Montreal Canadiens coaches
Ottawa Senators coaches
People from Weston, Toronto
Peterborough Petes (ice hockey) players
Philadelphia Flyers coaches
Slovakia men's national ice hockey team coaches
Ice hockey people from Toronto
Stanley Cup champions
Tampa Bay Lightning coaches
Ice hockey coaches at the 2022 Winter Olympics
Canadian expatriate sportspeople in Slovakia
Canadian expatriate ice hockey players in the United States
Olympic bronze medalists for Slovakia
Medalists at the 2022 Winter Olympics
Olympic medalists in ice hockey